Crowley is a city located mainly in Tarrant County in the U.S. state of Texas. The population was 18,070 at the 2020 census, up 40.8% from the 2010 census.

History 
Around 1848, pioneers began farming the area around Deer Creek. The settlement moved a mile or so west to the site of present-day downtown Crowley when the Gulf, Colorado and Santa Fe Railway built pens and laid tracks there. The first station depot was built in 1885. The community was named for S. H. Crowley, who was the master of transportation for the railroad.

An election to approve the incorporation of Crowley was held on February 3, 1951. The town council voted to change the designation of Crowley from a town to a city on September 3, 1972.

Geography
Crowley is in southern Tarrant County, with a  portion extending south into Johnson County.

The city is bordered to the north and east by Fort Worth and to the south by Burleson. The center of Crowley sits at the crossroads of Farm to Market Roads 1187 and 731.

Demographics

2020 census

As of the 2020 United States census, there were 18,070 people, 4,959 households, and 3,844 families residing in the city.

2010 census
As of the 2010 census there were 12,838 people, 4,408 households, and 3,424 families residing in the city. The population density was 1,769.5 people per square mile (683.2/km). There were 4,714 housing units at an average density of 649.8 per square mile (250.9/km).

Racial makeup
The racial makeup of the city in 2010 was 76.5% White, 13.3% African American, 0.8% Native American, 1.5% Asian, 0.1% Pacific Islander, 4.8% from other races, and 3.1% from two or more races. Hispanic or Latino of any race were 15.2% of the population.

Households
There were 4,408 households, out of which 41.5% had children under the age of 18 living with them, 55.3% were married couples living together, 17.1% had a female householder with no husband present, and 22.3% were non-families. 17.6% of all households were made up of individuals, and 5.6% had someone living alone who was 65 years of age or older. The average household size was 2.91 and the average family size was 3.29.

Age
In the city of Crowley, the population distribution by age in 2010 was 30.9% under the age of 18, 8.6% from 18 to 24, 30.2% from 25 to 44, 22.0% from 45 to 64, and 8.3% who were 65 years of age or older. The median age was 31.9 years.

Sex
For every 100 females, there are 93.3 males. For every 100 females age 18 and over, there were 88.2 males.

Income
The median income for a household in the city was $65,419, and the median income for a family was $66,888. Males had a median income of $47,037 versus $34,294 for females. The per capita income for the city was $24,806.

Poverty
About 6.3% of families and 7.9% of the population were below the poverty line, including 13.1% of those under age 18 and 1.3% of those age 65 or over.

Education 
The Crowley Independent School District extends north into Fort Worth and includes 22 public schools. Most of the district's schools are located within the Fort Worth city limits, including North Crowley High School and 9th Grade Campus, Crowley Middle School, and 12 elementary schools. Crowley High School and 9th Grade Campus, H.F. Stevens Middle School, and three elementary schools are within the Crowley city limits.

Nazarene Christian Academy in Crowley serves students from kindergarten through 12th grade.

Popular culture 
 The computer game Dark Seed II takes place in Crowley. It is the hometown of the protagonist Mike Dawson, who suffered a nervous breakdown from the events of the previous game.

References

External links
 City of Crowley official website
 Crowley Area Chamber of Commerce
 Crowley ISD
 Texas State Historical Association

 
Dallas–Fort Worth metroplex
Cities in Texas
Cities in Tarrant County, Texas
Cities in Johnson County, Texas
Populated places established in 1951
1951 establishments in Texas